Gilly Coman (13 September 1955 – 13 July 2010) was an English actress, who played Aveline in the first four series of Carla Lane's sitcom Bread.

She also appeared in Scully, Coronation Street, Brookside, A Touch of Frost, Springhill, Emmerdale Farm, the BBC sitcom Open All Hours and Inspector Morse in which she played Holly Trevors in the episode "The Day Of The Devil." 

She played Marigold Lockton in The Man Who Made Husbands Jealous (1997), the TV adaptation of the Jilly Cooper novel.

Coman died of a suspected heart attack on 13 July 2010 at her mother's grave in Church of the Resurrection and All Saints, Caldy, on the Wirral peninsula in Merseyside. She had a heart condition and died just two weeks before she was scheduled for a pacemaker operation.

References

External links

 Obituary in The Guardian

1955 births
2010 deaths
English soap opera actresses
English television actresses
Actresses from Liverpool